Fotbal Club UTA Arad is a Romanian professional football club based in Arad, Arad County.

Total statistics

Statistics by country

Statistics by competition

UEFA Champions League / European Cup

UEFA Europa League / UEFA Cup

Balkans Cup

References

Romanian football clubs in international competitions
FC UTA Arad